James "Jimmy" A. F. Hayton (born 1925 – death unknown) was an English professional rugby league footballer who played in the 1940s and 1950s.

Playing career

International honours
Jimmy Hayton won a cap for England while at Workington in 1949 against Other Nationalities.

County honours
Jimmy Hayton represented Cumberland. Jimmy Hayton played right-, i.e. number 10, in Cumberland's 5-4 victory over Australia in the 1948–49 Kangaroo tour of Great Britain and France match at the Recreation Ground, Whitehaven on Wednesday 13 October 1948, in front of a crowd of 8,818.

Challenge Cup Final appearances
Jimmy Hayton played left-, i.e. number 8, in Workington Town's 18-10 victory over Featherstone Rovers in the 1952 Challenge Cup Final during the 1951–52 season at Wembley Stadium, London on Saturday 19 April 1952, in front of a crowd of 72,093, and played right- in the 12-21 defeat by Barrow in the 1955 Challenge Cup Final during the 1954-55 season at Wembley Stadium, London on Saturday 30 April 1955, in front of a crowd of 66,513.

Genealogical information
Jimmy Hayton's marriage to Eva (née Asbury) was registered during fourth ¼ 1949 in Cockermouth district

References

External links
30 April 1955 Photograph of Workington Town

1925 births
Cumberland rugby league team players
England national rugby league team players
English rugby league players
Place of death missing
Rugby league players from Cockermouth
Rugby league props
Workington Town players
Year of death missing